Eldivan is a town in Çankırı Province in the Central Anatolia region of Turkey. It is the seat of Eldivan District. Its population is 3,291 (2021).

References

External links
 Municipality's official website 

Populated places in Çankırı Province
Eldivan District
Towns in Turkey